A graphing calculator is a class of hand-held calculator that is capable of plotting graphs and solving complex functions. While there are several companies that manufacture models of graphing calculators, Hewlett-Packard is a major manufacturer.

The following table compares general and technical information for Hewlett-Packard graphing calculators:

See also
 Comparison of Texas Instruments graphing calculators
 HP calculators
 List of Hewlett-Packard pocket calculators

References

HP calculators
HP calculators
Graphing calculators